Odyshape is the second album by the Raincoats, originally released on 1 June 1981 by Rough Trade.

The album was reissued in 1993 by Geffen Records, inspired by Kurt Cobain's public praise for the group.

Recording
Stylistically, Odyshape was a radical departure from the band's first album, featuring a diverse range of instruments, such as the shruti box, balophone, shehnai and kalimba, which they picked up at junk shops and markets or brought back from New York after their 1980 tour. The band incorporated influences from ethnic field recordings and musicians such as Ornette Coleman, and often swapped instrumental roles to freshen the arrangements.

Odyshape was recorded after Palmolive, the band's original drummer, had left the group, leaving the band to write without a drummer in mind; later the Raincoats hired Richard Dudanski (P.I.L.), Charles Hayward (This Heat) and Robert Wyatt (Soft Machine) to contribute percussion parts. Palmolive's original replacement, Ingrid Weiss, left during the start of the recording of Odyshape.

The album cover was based on the painting Peasant Woman by Russian artist Kazimir Malevich.

Reception

Pitchfork reviewer Nick Neyland said, "This album has little in common with anything else around at the time, other than the feeling that you're hurtling relentlessly forward into a previously unmapped musical space... It's a very intimate recording, full of sounds they wisely never tried to recreate again, and vocal takes that are often inflected with a heart-crushing vulnerability." Critic Simon Reynolds called it "postpunk that's been totally unrocked."

BBC Music writer Chris Power said, "More than the exotic instrumentation, though, it's the extraordinary structures of Odyshape'''s songs that distinguish it. They don't so much begin and end as ebb and flow in a way that, historically, seems to have bewildered at least as many listeners as it's beguiled." Noel Gardner of Drowned in Sound described the "new instruments" as essential to the recordings, noting that "you'd never call any of it 'prog', really, but the spirit of the commie beardos that comprised the Seventies Canterbury scene is being carried here nevertheless."

The album was reissued in 1993 by Geffen Records, inspired by Kurt Cobain's public praise for the group. The reissue features liner notes by Kim Gordon.

Track listing
All tracks composed by the Raincoats; except where indicated

"Shouting Out Loud" (The Raincoats, Ingrid Weiss) – 4:54
"Family Treet" (The Raincoats, Caroline Scott) – 4:12
"Only Loved at Night" – 3:32
"Dancing in My Head" – 5:26
"Odyshape" (The Raincoats, Ingrid Weiss) – 3:37
"And Then It's O.K." (The Raincoats, lyrics by Caroline Scott) – 3:05
"Baby Song" – 4:54
"Red Shoes" – 2:51
"Go Away" – 2:23

Personnel
The Raincoats
Ana da Silva – vocals, guitar, shruti box, kalimba, bass, percussion, harmonica
Gina Birch – vocals, bass, guitar, balafon
Vicky Aspinall – vocals, guitar, bass, violin, piano
with:
Georgie Born – cello on "Family Treet" and "Dancing in My Head"
Dick O’Dell, Shirley O'Loughlin, Kadir Durvesh Shehnai, Ingrid Weiss – percussion
Robert Wyatt – drums on "And Then It's O.K."
Richard Dudanski – drums on "Dancing in My Head"
Charles Hayward – drums on "Family Treet" and "Go Away"
Ingrid Weiss – drums on "Shouting Out Loud" and "Odyshape"

Cover versions
"Only Loved at Night" was covered by Softboiled Eggies for the Rough Trade Shops – Counter Culture 08'' compilation (2009).

References

1981 albums
The Raincoats albums
Rough Trade Records albums
Albums produced by Adam Kidron